Scott McDonald (born May 8, 1986) is a Canadian curler from St. Thomas, Ontario. He currently plays third on Team James Grattan.

Career
McDonald had a successful junior career which involved winning the 2002 provincial Bantam championship (playing lead for Andrew Nixon), the 2004 provincial school boy championship for London's St. Thomas Aquinas Catholic Secondary School, and the 2007 provincial junior mixed championship.

Following juniors, McDonald went on to play on the World Curling Tour, first for Kirk Ziola and then for Wayne Tuck, Jr. (playing second on both teams). In 2012, McDonald would form his own team as skip. McDonald won his first Tour event as a skip at the 2013 KW Fall Classic. He would win the event again in 2014.  After playing three seasons for the Codey Maus rink, McDonald formed his own team again in 2018. His new team found success on the Tour, winning the 2018 Challenge de Curling de Gatineau and playing in two Grand Slam events.

McDonald has played in five provincial championships. He played in the 2010 Ontario Men's Curling Championship with Ziola, finishing 2-8 and in the 2012 The Dominion Tankard with Tuck, finishing 5-5, finishing 6-5 (losing in a tiebreaker) at the 2017 Ontario Tankard, throwing last stones for Codey Maus, 5-3 at the 2018 Ontario Tankard (losing in the semifinal), playing third for Maus and winning the 2019 Ontario Tankard as a skip, going undefeated to win his first provincial title. McDonald went on to skip Team Ontario at the 2019 Tim Hortons Brier, leading his rink to a 6–5 record, finishing in sixth place overall.

Due to the COVID-19 pandemic in Canada, many provinces had to cancel their provincial championships, with member associations selecting their representatives for the 2021 Tim Hortons Brier. As the reigning provincial champions in Nova Scotia, Team Jamie Murphy was invited to represent Nova Scotia at the Brier, which they accepted. Murphy, however, opted not to attend the event due to travel restrictions. Murphy's team of Paul Flemming, Scott Saccary and Phil Crowell then invited McDonald to skip them at the national championship in Calgary, Alberta. At the 2021 Brier, McDonald led Team Nova Scotia to a 4–4 record, failing to qualify for the championship round.

McDonald won the Ontario Mixed Championship in 2022 with teammates Lori Eddy, Matthew Hall and Laura Neil. 

McDonald went to his first national championship when he and Jaclyn Rivington won the provincial mixed doubles challenge. The pair went to the 2013 Canadian Mixed Doubles Curling Trials. After going 7-0 in the round robin, they were eliminated in their first playoff match.

Personal life
McDonald works as an accident benefits claims adjuster for Intact Insurance. He is engaged to Laura Neil.

Grand Slam record

References

External links

1986 births
Living people
Canadian male curlers
Curlers from Ontario
People from St. Thomas, Ontario
Sportspeople from Mississauga